The XXVI World Rhythmic Gymnastics Championships were held in Budapest, the capital of Hungary, during September 24–29, 2003.

Medal winners

Individual Events

Individual All-Around

Individual Hoop

Individual Ball

Individual Clubs

Individual Ribbon

Groups Finals

Groups All-Around

Groups 5 Ribbons

Groups 3 Hoops + 2 Balls

Medal table

References

https://web.archive.org/web/20080927032230/http://www.fig-gymnastics.com/vsite/vnavsite/page/directory/0,10853,5187-188044-205266-nav-list,00.html

Rhythmic Gymnastics World Championships
Rhythmic Gymnastics Championships
Rhythmic Gymnastics Championships
Rhythmic Gymnastics Championships